Burnay Palace (Portuguese: Palácio Burnay) is a Portuguese palace located in the Alcântara parish in Lisbon, Portugal.

History 
The origins of the palace lie with D. César de Meneses, having started in 1701 and ended in 1734. The palace has since undergone changes and restoration works in the nineteenth century and more recently in the early 1940s.

The palace is also called by the Palace of the Patriarchs because it was previously the official summer residence of the Patriarchs of Lisbon.

The palace is currently the seat of the Rectory Services and Social Actions of the Technical University of Lisbon.

IGESPAR rates the palace as a Property of Interest.

Gallery

Sources 
Pesquisa de Património: Palácio Burnay, Seus Anexos e Jardim (In Portuguese)
Palácio Burnay: Texto histórico (In Portuguese)
História de Portugal: Palácio Burnay (In Portuguese)

Palaces in Lisbon